CSU Aurel Vlaicu Arad is a Romanian semi-professional rugby union club from Arad, which plays in the 2018–2019 season of the Divizia Națională de Seniori, the second level of Romanian rugby.

Current squad

International honours 
  Roman Gobjila
  Oliver Breffit

See also
 Rugby union in Romania

External links
 Divizia Națională de Seniori Squad Details
 PlanetaOvala.ro - Romanian Rugby News

Romanian rugby union teams
Rugby clubs established in 2001